Samvel Tumanyan (born 25 February 1949) is an Armenian politician. He attended at Yerevan State University. Tumanyan served as a People's Party and National Unity member of the National Assembly of Armenia from 1999 to 2003. He was honored the Order of Friendship of Peoples in 1986.

References 

1949 births
Living people
Politicians from Yerevan
People's Party (Armenia) politicians
National Unity (Armenia) politicians
20th-century Armenian politicians
21st-century Armenian politicians
Yerevan State University alumni
Recipients of the Order of Friendship of Peoples
Members of the National Assembly (Armenia)